MVN University, located on NH2, Delhi-Agra National highway, Delhi NCR Region, Haryana, India, is a private university. It was established in 2012 by State Legislature under Haryana Private Universities Act 32 of 2006 (Amendment) Act 2010. MVNU is part of Modern Vidya Niketan Society, the managing body. It offers wide range of undergraduate, postgraduate and doctoral programmes.

Schools
 School of Engineering & Technology
 School of Business management & Commerce
 School of Art, Science & Humanities
 School of Law
 School of Pharmaceutical Sciences
 School of Allied Health Sciences
 School of Agriculture

Campus
University has 28 acres of sprawling campus having  ACclass rooms, laboratories, Gym, Boys hostel, cafeteria & central library,

Recognition
Like all universities in India, MVN University is approved by the University Grants Commission (UGC). The programmes by the School of Law are approved by the Bar Council of India (BCI) and the pharmacy diploma and degree programmes offered by the School of Pharmaceutical Sciences are approved by the Pharmacy Council of India (PCI). The university is also a member of the Association of Indian Universities (AIU).

References

Private universities in India
Universities in Haryana